William Ulick O'Connor Cuffe, 4th Earl of Desart (10 July 1845 – 15 September 1898). He succeeded to the title of  6th Baron Desart, 4th Viscount Desart and 4th Earl of Desart on 1 April 1865

Background
Desart was the son of John Cuffe, 3rd Earl of Desart, and Lady Elizabeth Lucy Campbell. He had an older sister and two younger brothers. One of his brothers, Hamilton, succeeded him as 5th Earl. The other, Captain Otway Cuffe went on to be mayor of Kilkenny and a notable person with the community.

Activities
Desert was also a literary man who wrote fifteen novels during his life. His most successful works were mystery thrillers.
 Only a Woman's Love (1869), Herne Lodge (1888) and The Little Chatelaine (1889)
 Beyond These Voices (1870) was set against the background of the Fenian Rising.
Other titles included:
 Children of Nature: A Story of Modern London (1878)
 The Honourable Ella (1879)
 Lord and Lady Piccadilly (1887)
  Mervyn O'Connor and other tales (1880)
 Grandborough  (1894)
 The raid of the "Detrimental" (1897)
 Kelverdale (1879)
 Helen's vow (1891)
 Love and pride on an iceberg : and other tales (1887)

Family
Lord Desart married  Maria Emma Georgina Preston, daughter of Captain Thomas Henry Preston and Georgina Geneviève Louisa Campbell, on 1 June 1871. They had one daughter, Kathleen. They divorced in 1878.

He then married Ellen Cuffe, Countess of Desart, daughter of Henri Louis Bischoffsheim on 27 April 1881. Lord Desart died in 1898 at age 53 after a short illness on his yacht, and was succeeded in the earldom by his brother, Hamilton. The Countess of Desart went on to become a politician in her own right and died in June 1933, aged 75.

References

1845 births
1898 deaths
People from County Kilkenny
Irish mystery writers
19th-century Irish writers
Earls of Desart